Platysmacheilus is a genus of cyprinid fish endemic to China.  There are currently four described species in this genus.

Species
 Platysmacheilus exiguus (S. Y. Lin, 1932)
 Platysmacheilus longibarbatus Y. L. Lu, P. Q. Luo & Yi-Yu Chen, 1977
 Platysmacheilus nudiventris P. Q. Luo, Le & Yi-Yu Chen, 1977
 Platysmacheilus zhenjiangensis Y. Ni, X. H. Chen & G. Zhou, 2005

References
 

 
Cyprinidae genera
Cyprinid fish of Asia
Freshwater fish of China